Race to the Center of the Earth is an American reality television show that premiered on March 29, 2021. The show was created by Elise Doganieri and Bertram van Munster, who previously had created The Amazing Race, of which Race to the Center of the Earth is fashioned after.

The show consists of four teams of three adventurers racing to "the center of the Earth." The four teams start in different corners of the Earth and all race along designated routes to a buoy in the middle of the ocean, designating the center of the Earth. There are no eliminations, but the first team to reach the buoy wins and gets to split the million-dollar prize that goes along with it.

Contestants

Results
Each day, teams received a pre-determined pace time to pass through a series of waypoints until they reach the final waypoint. If they finished at least 30 minutes ahead of the pace time, they would receive 2 points. If they arrived within 30 minutes of the pace time, they would receive 1 point. If they finished behind the pace time, they would receive 0 points. If they fell so far behind that they were swept off the course for safety reasons, they would lose a point. The scores would determine the starting placement of teams in the final stage with the highest scoring team in pole position.

Production 
On May 14, 2019, National Geographic Networks ordered the creation of a new show, titled Race to the Center of the Earth, which involved four teams of three competing from different locations in the world and racing to a singular buoy in the mid-Pacific Ocean. Geoff Daniels, executive VP of unscripted entertainment for National Geographic Networks, stated, "Unlike other competition formats, Race to the Center of the Earth will combine the grittiness of a survival show with the cinematic style of a feature film action-thriller dropping viewers into the middle of a heart-pounding journey unlike anything ever made for television." Casting for the series began in June 2019, and filming started and ended in October, taking only two and a half weeks to finish. On January 17, 2020, at the TV Critics Association press tour, it was announced that the four teams would be competing from different corners of the Earth, one starting in Canada, one in South America, one in Southeast Asia, and one in Siberia in eastern Russia. During the interviewing at the press tour, co-creator Elise Doganieri explained that the routes for each team were meticulously planned and tested to be equal and fair. According to Bertram van Munster, the production team tested each route three times to ensure fairness. The first season premiered on March 29, 2021, and the season was released in its entirety on Disney+ on May 14, 2021 during the week of its finale. On January 20, 2022, National Geographic announced that the show would not be renewed for a second season.

Episodes

Notes

References

External links 
 
 

2020s American reality television series
2021 American television series debuts
Adventure reality television series
National Geographic (American TV channel) original programming
English-language television shows
Television productions postponed due to the COVID-19 pandemic
Television shows set in Asia
Television shows set in North America
Television shows set in South America
Television shows filmed in Quebec
Television shows filmed in Ontario
Television shows filmed in Alberta
Television shows filmed in British Columbia
Television shows filmed in Russia
Television shows filmed in Argentina
Television shows filmed in Chile
Television shows filmed in Vietnam
Television shows filmed in Laos
Television shows filmed in Thailand
Television shows filmed in Malaysia
Television shows filmed in Singapore
Television shows filmed in Hawaii